Nervia heathi is a species of butterfly in the family Hesperiidae. It is found in Zambia (from the north-western part of the country to the Copperbelt).

References

Butterflies described in 1982
Endemic fauna of Zambia
Butterflies of Africa